Rose walnut is a common name for several flowering plants in the family Lauraceae, in a different family and order from true walnut trees, and may refer to:

Cryptocarya erythroxylon, native to Australia
Endiandra discolor, native to Australia